Vriesea procera is a plant species in the genus Vriesea. This species is an epiphyte native to Trinidad and South America.

Four varieties are recognized:

Vriesea procera var. debilis Mez  - Trinidad, southern + eastern Brazil
Vriesea procera var. procera - Trinidad, southern + eastern Brazil, Guianas, Venezuela, Bolivia, Argentina, Paraguay
Vriesea procera var. rubra L.B.Sm - Trinidad, eastern Brazil
Vriesea procera var. tenuis L.B.Sm - eastern Brazil from Bahia to São Paulo

Cultivars
 Vriesea 'Acker Built'

References

procera
Flora of South America
Flora of Trinidad and Tobago
Epiphytes
Plants described in 1830